Flat Lake (Nova Scotia) could refer to the following lakes:

Antigonish County 

 Flat Lake located at

Halifax Regional Municipality 

 Flat Lake a lake near the Burnside Industrial Park in Dartmouth at 
 Flat Lake a lake near Stillwater Lake  at
 Flat Lake a lake near Upper Hammonds Plains at
 Flat Lake a lake in Timberlea at 
 Flat Lake a lake in Spryfield at 
 Flat Lake a lake on the Chebucto Peninsula at 
 Flat Lake a lake near Herring Cove 
 'Flat Lakes' a lakes in the Eastern Shore Area at

Region of Queens Municipality 
 Flat Lake a lake in the Kejimkujik National Park of Canada at

Yarmouth County 
 Flat Lake a lake at

References
Geographical Names Board of Canada
Explore HRM
Nova Scotia Placenames

Lakes of Nova Scotia